Mount Roberts may refer to:

 Mount Roberts (Alaska) near Juneau, Alaska, USA
 Mount Roberts (Nunivak Island), Alaska, USA
 Mount Roberts (Antarctica)
 Mount Roberts (New Hampshire) in New Hampshire, USA
 Mount Roberts (Prince of Wales Range) on Vancouver Island, British Columbia, Canada
 Mount Roberts (Queensland) in the Great Dividing Range, Queensland, Australia
 Mount Roberts (Rossland Range) in the interior of British Columbia, Canada

See also: Roberts Mountains and Roberts Peak